King of Reggaeton may refer to:

Daddy Yankee, Puerto Rican musical artist
 Don Omar, Puerto Rican musical artist